The TCU Horned Frogs women's basketball team represents Texas Christian University in women's basketball. The school competes in the Big 12 Conference in Division I of the National Collegiate Athletic Association (NCAA). The Horned Frogs play home basketball games at Schollmaier Arena in Fort Worth, Texas.

History
The Frogs began play in 1977, and they joined Division I play in 1982. They have an all-time record of 547–607, with a 472–533 record in Division I. They have won 3 conference titles in both regular season (2001, 2002, 2010) and tournament (2001, 2003, 2005). They have reached the NCAA Tournament nine times, having a 5–9 record, going to the Second Round five times. They were a member of the Texas Association for Intercollegiate Athletics for Women (TAIAW) from 1977 to 1982, the Southwest Conference from 1982 to 1996, the Western Athletic Conference from 1996 to 2001, Conference USA from 2002 to 2005, the Mountain West Conference from 2005 to 2012, and the Big 12 Conference since 2012.

NCAA tournament results

References

External links